Geotrichum candidum var. citri-aurantii is a plant pathogen. It is a common post harvest fungus disease of citrus known as "sour rot".

References

Saccharomycetes
Fungi described in 1955
Fungal citrus diseases